Shreyanshi Pardeshi (born 4 May 1998) is an Indian female badminton player.

Achievements

BWF International Challenge/Series 
Women's singles

  BWF International Challenge tournament
  BWF International Series tournament
  BWF Future Series tournament

References

External links
 

Living people
1998 births
Indian female badminton players